Jesper Borgen (born 21 September 1988) is a Norwegian songwriter and producer. Songs written and produced by Jesper have been nominated for Brit Awards "British Single Of The Year", Echo Awards "Song Of The Year", P3 Gull "Song Of The Year", and Billboard Music Awards, as well as winning "Song Of The Year" at Spellemannsprisen, "Song Of The Year" at NRJ Music Awards Norge, "Western Single Of The Year" at KKBox Music Awards, "Best International Hit" at the Swiss Music Awards, and the TONO award for "Songwriter Of The Year" in Norway 2015.

He has been involved in both writing and producing extensively for Alan Walker, starting with the song "Faded", which became a worldwide hit with over five million single sales, reached number 1 in the official charts in 19 countries, and has over 1,5 billion Spotify streams. He was also a part of making the successful follow up singles for Walker, "Sing Me to Sleep" and Darkside. Jesper Borgen has written, collaborated with, and produced for artist like Bebe Rexha, Steve Aoki, Farruko, Sabrina Carpenter, Felix Jaehn, Seeb, Girls Generation, Christopher, Victon, and Tove Styrke. His work has been remixed by artists like Marshmello and he has produced official remixes for the likes of Coldplay.

Tracks

Awards and nominations

References

Norwegian record producers
1988 births
Living people